In October 2018, the Law Enforcement Conduct Commission (LECC) announced plans to launch a formal investigation into the use of strip searches by members the New South Wales Police Force, citing complaints from members of the public and wider community concerns surrounding the practice. As part of a two-year inquiry, the Commission conducted a number of closed-door investigations relating to specific complaints, as well as two public hearings in relation to strip searches of minors at separate music festivals in 2018 and 2019. In a final report handed down in December 2020, the Commission made a total of 25 recommendations aimed at improving existing protocols governing the use of strip searches by NSW Police.

Review of police standard operating procedures 
As part of its investigation, the commission began an initial review of protocols governing the use of the use of searches in custody at police stations in New South Wales, with a particular focus on strip searches. At the commencement of the review, the commission was made aware of the fact that there were 113 separate Standard Operating Procedure (SOPs) currently in use by NSW Police, with some being exclusive to specific police stations while others applied to wider police area commands. A report handed down in February 2020 found that there were "considerable discrepancies" in the instructions given to police across separate SOPs, with the commission finding that many of the existing guidelines contained "incorrect and inconsistent" information and that "none provided sufficient guidance as to the procedures that police should follow in conducting those searches". A single standardised set of protocols for searches in custody was introduced in August 2019, referred to as the "Charge Room and Custody Management Standard Operating Procedures" or "Custody SOPs".

In conjunction with the release of the new Custody SOPs, NSW Police had also released an updated "Person Search Manual" – an updated set of guidelines for officers to follow when conducting general searches and strip searches in custody and in the field. The document was made publicly available in September 2019. At a coronial inquest in July earlier that year, Counsel Assisting the Coroner Dr. Peggy Dwyer had called on NSW Police to release its strip search protocols. The request was made after a 28-year-old witness had broken down in tears at the inquest while recalling how an officer had ordered her to strip naked and repeatedly "squat and cough" inside a booth at the Knockout Circuz music festival in 2017. The officer had reportedly threatened to make the woman's search "nice and slow" if she failed to produce any drugs.

Responding to the release of the new Custody SOPs and Person Search Manual, the LECC expressed concerns about a number of the instructions put forward in both documents, suggesting they were "wrong at law". "The Person Search Manual currently states that police officers may, amongst other things, request that a person squat, lift their breasts, part their buttock cheeks or turn their body," the Commission noted. A subsequent internal investigation conducted by NSW Police (see ) made reference to the Commission's objections, stating that, "The NSWPF does not intend to reverse their current instructions to police on these aspects of person searches".

Operation Brugge 
 
In September 2019, the LECC announced plans to hold a public hearing in relation to an incident which had allegedly taken place at the Splendour in the Grass music festival in July 2018. The inquiry would seek to determine whether officers had unlawfully strip searched a 16-year-old girl who was attending the event, while also conducting a broader examination of strip search practices employed by NSW Police. 

On the first day of the inquiry, the Commission was told how the 16-year-old had been left feeling "completely humiliated" after being made to strip naked in front of a female police officer inside a tent at the event. The inquiry was told that the girl had been queuing up at the entrance of the festival when she was stopped by a drug detection dog, at which point she was taken to a separate area where she was questioned and strip searched.

The Commission was told that police had conducted 512 personal searches over the course of the 2018 Splendour in the Grass music festival, including 143 strip searches. More than 90% of strip searches conducted at the event had resulted in no drugs being found. Seven of the festivalgoers strip searched by police were recorded as being under the age of 18.

A final report from the inquiry was handed down by the LECC in May 2020, with the Commission finding that the strip search performed on the 16-year-old was "unlawful". The Commission found that police had failed to adhere to legal requirements mandating the presence of a support person when strip searching a person under the age of 18 and that the strip search itself was not justified, stating that "neither [of the officers involved] possessed a suspicion on reasonable grounds that a strip search was necessary for the purposes of the search". The Commission found that the conduct of the officer while conducting the strip search was also unlawful.

The report also identified a number of broader issues relating to policing at the 2018 Splendour in the Grass music festival. The Commission found that police record keeping at the event was inadequate and that officers possessed insufficient knowledge of key legal requirements in relation to strip searches. The Commission also criticised the tent used by police to search patrons at the event, finding that it did not offer "reasonable privacy" on account of the fact that it "did not fully close, so that even, from the corner of the tent, [the girl] could see [the other officer involved] standing outside, with his back to the tent".

Responding to the findings, NSW Police Commissioner Mick Fuller said he was "disappointed" with the conduct of officers in relation to the strip search of the 16-year-old.

Operation Gennaker 
A second public hearing was announced by the LECC in November 2019, this time investigating complaints of unlawful strip searches at an under 18's music festival at Sydney Olympic Park earlier in the year. The inquiry was centred around allegations made by three teenage boys who had allegedly been strip searched at the Lost City music festival in February, while also examining strip search practices employed by NSW Police more broadly. This second four-day hearing commenced at the Commission's Elizabeth Street headquarters on 2 December and was presided over by LECC Chief Commissioner Justice Michael Adams. Over the course of the hearing, the Commission heard evidence from multiple witnesses, including twelve police officers who were present at the event. The inquiry was told that police had strip searched 30 attendees, 27 male and 3 female, with drugs being found in nine of those searches.

In a final report handed down in May 2020, the LECC concluded that each of the three strip searches investigated during the hearing was unlawful. The Commission found that in all three cases, officers had failed adhere to legal requirements mandating the presence a support person when strip searching a person under the age of 18. The Commission also found that the searches of the 15-year-old and 17-year-old were not justified, however due to poor record keeping practices at the event it was unable to make conclusive findings in relation to the 16-year old's complaint, as the officer who had conducted the search could not be identified. It was concluded that the 16-year-old had most likely been searched by an unidentified male officer partnered with a detective sergeant who had given evidence at the hearing.

The Commission's report also highlighted a number of other concerns relating to policing at the Lost City music festival in 2019, finding that the officers who gave evidence at the hearing lacked knowledge of their legal requirements in relation to strip searches and had not been adequately trained or instructed on how to perform them. The report also criticised police record keeping at the event, describing it as inadequate and unsatisfactory. Despite acknowledging that officers had engaged in unlawful conduct, the Commission declined to make serious misconduct findings against any police officer who gave evidence at the hearing, citing a "lack of training and direction" which had been provided to them.

Dismissal of LECC chief commissioner 
In December 2019, it was announced that LECC Chief Commissioner Michael Adams would not have his term in the role extended, with his contract set to expire on 31 January 2020. The decision was announced by New South Wales Special Minister of State Don Harwin. The move was criticised by a number of state opposition MPs, who suggested it was a deliberate attempt by the government to derail the Commission's ongoing inquiry into the use of  strip searches by NSW Police. In the days leading up to the announcement, Adams had been the subject of controversy after suggesting that corrupt police officers were involved in the state's methamphetamine trade. The comments had been condemned by the New South Wales Police Association, with President Tony King labelling the accusations "disgusting".

In February 2020, The Guardian reported that Adams' dismissal had come after a complaint was made by LECC Oversight Commissioner Patrick Saidi. Saidi had reportedly raised concerns about management at the organisation, accusing Adams of running the LECC in an "autocratic fashion". An internal investigation carried out by the Commission's Assistant Inspector Bruce McClintock found no merit to the allegations, suggesting instead that Saidi himself may have engaged in "maladministration or misconduct". In January 2020, it was reported that Saidi had been sacked in his role as Oversight Commissioner by the New South Wales Government.

Following Adams' dismissal, former Supreme Court Justice Reginald (Reg) Blanch was appointed as interim head of the LECC, later assuming the role on a permanent basis in August 2020.

Operation Karuka 
In July 2017, a complaint was made to the Commission by a 29-year-old Aboriginal man who had allegedly been strip searched in custody at a Sydney police station. The matter was initially investigated by NSW Police, who in October 2017 recommended that "not sustained" findings be made against the officers involved.  The LECC subsequently launched a separate investigation in October 2018, including reviewing CCTV footage from both searches and receiving testimony from the eight officers who were present. In the Commission's final report handed down in May 2020, the report described the man's treatment in custody as highly unsatisfactory, and found that the second strip search performed on the 29-year-old was unjustified. However, they found no merit in allegations that he was racially vilified or digitally penetrated during either of the two strip searches.The Commission criticised what it described as a miscommunication between the officers involved in the man's detention, but ultimately concluded that the actions of police did not amount to serious misconduct.

Operation Mainz 
The LECC conducted an investigation into the strip searching and arrest of a 16-year-old boy in November 2018 in regional New South Wales. In a final report handed down in May 2020, the LECC found that both the initial strip search conducted in the street and the subsequent strip search conducted at the police station were carried out in breach of legal requirements. The Commission found that actions of police amounted to unsatisfactory performance but did not recommend that serious misconduct findings be made against any of the four officers involved, citing an "absence of effective training" provided prior to the incident.

Investigation into the arrest, detention and strip searching of two female protestors 
In January 2018, the Commission began overseeing an internal police investigation stemming from separate complaints made by two women who had been strip searched at Newtown police station in 2017. The women had been attending a pro-refugee rally in Eveleigh before being arrested when the protest moved into the inner-city suburb of Redfern. The pair were then transported back to Newtown police station where they were separately taken into a cell and strip searched. "I was informed that they would need to conduct a strip-search and this was for my protection because I was in their care and custody and there might be something on my person I could hurt myself with", one of the women told Buzzfeed News. Both women were later released without charge.

Three internal investigations were launched in response to the matter. In findings handed down in May 2018, a police investigator recommended that "not sustained" findings be made against the officers who had strip searched the two women, though did recommend that "sustained" findings be made against the officer who had ordered that the two women be strip searched, citing a failure to comply with LEPRA guidelines. That officer was issued a Commanders' Warning Notice and was required to undergo training.

Responding to those findings, the Commission raised concerns about several aspects of the police investigation, noting that the investigator had not spoken to either of the two complainants during the investigation. In June of 2019, the Commission wrote to NSW Police advising that it did not agree with the "not sustained" findings made against the officers who had strip searched the two women, suggesting that in the view of the LECC "there could be no finding other than a sustained finding" in the matter. Sustained findings were ultimately made against the two officers.

In a final report published in June 2020, the Commission noted that NSW Police had refused an initial request to hand over two documents which had been requested as part of its investigation, objecting on the grounds that the material could "invoke the provisions commonly referred to as legal professional privilege". After several additional requests were made, the documents were eventually provided to the Commission, seven months after they had first been requested.

In September 2019, it was reported that NSW Police had issued a formal apology for the "distress and embarrassment" caused during the incident, agreeing to settle a civil case launched by the two women for an undisclosed amount.

Operation Sandbridge 
An investigation into the unlawful detention and strip search of a 53-year-old man at Kings Cross police station in 2015. The incident had been referred to the Commission after the matter was heard in the District Court of New South Wales in 2018. The 53-year-old had been made to "strip to a naked state, squat and expose his genitals", describing the experience as "humiliating" and "outrageous". In handing down his judgement, Presiding Justice Phillip Taylor found that the officers involved had acted with "an almost reckless indifference" before awarding the man just over $112,000 in damages.

In reviewing the incident, the Commission examined the conduct of the four officers involved in the arrest and subsequent strip search of the 53-year-old. The investigation focused primarily on the actions of a female senior constable who had made the decision to detain the man before transporting him to Kings Cross police station. The woman had later instructed two male officers to strip search the 53-year-old while he was in custody. She was referred to in the Commission's report as "SAN1". In his ruling, Justice Taylor had raised concerns about the officer's conduct, expressing his belief that the decision to conduct a strip search was not based on any genuine suspicion of wrongdoing, but was instead motivated by the man's "lack of submission" at the scene of his arrest. The 53-year-old had initially refused to submit to search in Darlinghurst when the senior constable had told him she suspected he was in possession of illicit drugs. Justice Taylor found that the officer had "no reasonable grounds" to support this suspicion and that the subsequent arrest of the man was "unlawful". After the strip search had been conducted, the officer had reportedly said to the man, "You see, if you just did what we asked you to do, this could have all been avoided".

In a final report handed down in May 2020, the Commission found that the actions of SAN1 amounted to serious misconduct, suggesting that the senior constable "thought she was entitled to obedience" and was "indifferent to the legal limits of her powers as a police officer". It was also revealed that the woman had attempted to influence the testimony of other officers during the investigation. In a submission to the LECC, legal counsel for SAN1 argued against the serious misconduct findings, highlighting the senior constable's previous record as a police officer and citing a lack of training provided to her in relation to strip searches. The Commission maintained that the serious misconduct findings should be upheld, but on the basis of this submission ultimately decided to make "no recommendation as to reviewable action".

Strike Force Blackford report 
In July 2020, the LECC published the findings of an internal police investigation carried out by officers from the Force's Professional Standards Command. The investigation was monitored by the Commission and centred around five complaints made in relation to unlawful strip searches, four of which had allegedly taken place at separate music festivals across New South Wales. In each incident, a strip search had reportedly been conducted after a positive indication from a drug detection dog. None of the individuals searched were found in possession of any illicit substances.

One of those incidents stemmed from a complaint made to NSW Police by the mother of a 19-year-old woman who had allegedly been strip searched at a music festival in March 2019. The woman had been attending the Hidden music festival at Sydney Olympic Park when she was reportedly stopped by a drug detection dog. It's alleged that she was then escorted to a police search area inside the venue before being taken into a booth with a female officer, who instructed her to remove her clothes. The officer had reportedly asked the 19-year-old to "squat and cough" while she was completely undressed. It was also alleged that the door of the booth had been left unlocked while the search was taking place. Despite no drugs being found, the 19-year-old was issued with a 'ban notice' prohibiting entry to the Sydney Olympic Park precinct for six-months.

Following an investigation, NSW Police conceded that there was "insufficient lawful basis" to strip search the 19-year-old. Findings published in the report alleged that officers had mistakenly identified the woman as carrying drugs, with investigators claiming that the dog's handler had said "same as the last girl" and pointed to the woman's groin before handing her over to a male police officer. This officer, referred to as "MIS5", acknowledged that it was his decision to have the 19-year-old strip searched, reportedly using a similar phrase when handing the woman over to the female officer who had conducted the search. It's alleged that she had just finished searching another woman who had admitted to concealing drugs internally. In relation to the conduct of the search itself, the report acknowledged that the door of the booth had been left open, suggesting that "officer safety required the door to remain unlocked" and that "the doors were unable to be fully closed as they apparently locked automatically".
 
Police investigators also found that there were "insufficient reasons or grounds" to issue the woman with the 6 month ban notice. "Sustained" findings were recommended against MIS5, who had issued the document and a female officer referred to as "MIS8", who he believed had directed him to do so. MIS8 had questioned the girl after the strip search had been conducted. No disciplinary findings were mentioned against any officer in relation to the search, however the LECC recommended that NSW Police consider issuing an apology to the woman. The Commission was also informed that police investigators were inquiring as to why the police database entries in relation to the strip search and the ban notice had been deleted, as requests for deletion were required to be "directed to the Commissioner of Police who will then forward the request to the appropriate Region for consideration".

In another incident, a complaint had been made by the parents of a 21-year-old performer who had allegedly been taken to a tent and made to "pull her underpants down and bend over" after being stopped by a drug detection dog at the Secret Garden music festival in 2019. In findings published in July 2020, police investigators found that there was "no apparent justification" for strip searching the woman, alleging that the officer who conducted the search was under the belief "that she had been directed to search all persons upon whom the drug dogs had detected". When questioned about the matter, the officer claimed to have no specific recall of the incident, telling investigators that "I don't recall the female herself at all. I recall on the day I strip searched alot  of females. And the majority of those females I witness(ed) (sic) the drug dog indicate on". It was also acknowledged that after the search had been completed, a male officer had spoken to the woman and made comments to the effect that "the drug dog sat for you again, we will have to press charges", before other officers laughed and told the 21-year-old that she should "take a joke". Speaking to investigators, the officer conceded that his comments were "inappropriate and unprofessional", suggesting that he was attempting to "make light of a difficult situation". The report found that the officer's conduct constituted a "breach of the NSWPF Code of Conduct and Ethics".

Two separate complaints had also been made by festivalgoers who attended the Midnight Mafia music festival at Sydney Showground. A solicitor acting on behalf of an 18-year-old woman who had attended the event in 2018 alleged that she had been unlawfully strip searched by officers after a drug detection dog indication, describing the incident as "traumatic". It's alleged that two female officers had initially performed a general search and had conducted a search of the woman's bag where they found a "Vicks inhaler and a lollipop". The report suggested that "that these items have been linked to the use of prohibited drugs at music festivals" and that they had "increased the searching officer's suspicion that she may have been in possession of illicit drugs". A strip search was then conducted by the two officers, though due to a "miscommunication" between the pair neither officer had made a record of the search on the police database. Despite no drugs being, found the woman's ticket was cancelled and she was ejected from the event. Both officers denied any wrongdoing and police investigators recommended that "Not Sustained findings be made with respect to the lawfulness and conduct of the search".

In another incident, NSW Police had launched an investigation in response to an article published by The Sunday Telegraph in May 2019. The Telegraph had spoken to two patrons (a man and a woman) who had allegedly been ejected from the Midnight Mafia music festival after being strip searched by police. Both festivalgoers had reportedly been stopped after separate drug detection dog indications. No illicit substances were found and the pair described the searches as "humiliating". Following an investigation, NSW Police recommended that "not sustained" findings be made against both the male officer who had strip searched the man and the female officer who had strip searched the woman. 

The report also made reference to a 5th complaint made by two women who had allegedly been strip searched outside Sydney's Star Casino in January 2019. That incident had been investigated by NSW Police but the investigation was not overseen by the Commission. The women had reportedly been stopped after an indication from a drug detection dog. During the incident, it's alleged that one of the women had been asked to remove a tampon while a strip search was conducted. An internal police investigation found that there was a "a lack of clarity for frontline officers regarding the lawfulness of such a request", however no further details about the incident or subsequent findings of the investigation were provided in the report.

Final report 

In December 2020, the LECC handed down a final report detailing the findings of its two-year inquiry into strip search practices employed by the New South Wales Police Force.

The Commission found that "a recurrent issue throughout the inquiry was the failure of officers to comply with, or at least to properly account for their compliance with, the legal thresholds for conducting a strip search". The report made reference to the findings of several previous LECC investigations, including two public hearings centred around the unlawful strip searches of minors at separate music festivals in 2018 and 2019. Additional information published in the report included statistical data and internal police guidelines which had not previously been made available to the public.

A total of 25 recommendations were made by the Commission, generally centred around better guidance and training for officers and improved record keeping practices. Echoing a request made by the New South Wales Ombudsman in 2009, the Commission also called on Parliament to clarify whether it was lawful to instruct a person to squat or move their genitals in the course of a search.

In a statement uploaded to Facebook, a spokesperson for NSW Police said that the organisation would review the Commission's findings, noting that several changes had already been made to existing strip search procedures and that "since 2016, the percentage of strip searches conducted in the field resulting in a find has risen from 33% to 46%".

Notes

References 

Strip search